In computing, procedural generation (sometimes shortened as proc-gen) is a method of creating data algorithmically as opposed to manually, typically through a combination of human-generated assets and algorithms coupled with computer-generated randomness and processing power. In computer graphics, it is commonly used to create textures and 3D models. In video games, it is used to automatically create large amounts of content in a game. Depending on the implementation, advantages of procedural generation can include smaller file sizes, larger amounts of content, and randomness for less predictable gameplay. Procedural generation is a branch of media synthesis.

Overview

The term procedural refers to the process that computes a particular function. Fractals are geometric patterns which can often be generated procedurally. Commonplace procedural content includes textures and meshes. Sound is often also procedurally generated, and has applications in both speech synthesis as well as music. It has been used to create compositions in various genres of electronic music by artists such as Brian Eno who popularized the term "generative music".

While software developers have applied procedural generation techniques for years, few products have employed this approach extensively. Procedurally generated elements have appeared in earlier video games: The Elder Scrolls II: Daggerfall takes place in a mostly procedurally generated world, giving a world roughly two thirds the actual size of the British Isles. Soldier of Fortune from Raven Software uses simple routines to detail enemy models, while its sequel featured a randomly-generated level mode. Avalanche Studios employed procedural generation to create a large and varied group of detailed tropical islands for Just Cause. No Man's Sky, a game developed by games studio Hello Games, is all based upon procedurally generated elements.

The modern demoscene uses procedural generation to package a great deal of audiovisual content into relatively small programs.

New methods and applications are presented annually in conferences such as the IEEE Conference on Computational Intelligence and Games and the AAAI Conference on Artificial Intelligence and Interactive Digital Entertainment.

Particularly in the application of procedural generation with video games, which are intended to be highly replayable, there are concerns that procedural systems can generate infinite numbers of worlds to explore, but without sufficient human guidance and rules to guide these. The result has been called "procedural oatmeal", a term coined by writer Kate Compton, in that while it is possible to mathematically generate thousands of bowls of oatmeal with procedural generation, they will be perceived to be the same by the user, and lack the notion of perceived uniqueness that a procedural system should aim for.

Contemporary application

Tabletop role-playing games
Using procedural generation in games had origins in the tabletop role playing game (RPG) venue. The leading tabletop system, Advanced Dungeons & Dragons, provided ways for the "dungeon master" to generate dungeons and terrain using random die rolls, expanded in later editions with complex branching procedural tables. Strategic Simulations under license from TSR released the Dungeon Master's Assistant, a computer program that generated dungeons based on these published tables. Tunnels & Trolls, published by Flying Buffalo, was designed primarily around solitary play and used similar procedural generation for its dungeons. Other tabletop RPGs borrowed similar concepts in procedural generation for various world elements.

Many online tools for Dungeon Masters now use procedural generation to varying degrees.

Video games

Early history

Prior to graphically oriented video games, roguelike games, a genre directly inspired by Dungeons & Dragons adopted for solitaire play, heavily utilized procedural generation in the same manner that tabletop systems had done. Such early games include Beneath Apple Manor (1978) and the genre's namesake, Rogue (1980). The procedural generation system in roguelikes would create dungeons in ASCII- or regular tile-based systems and define rooms, hallways, monsters, and treasure to challenge the player. Roguelikes, and games based on the roguelike concepts, allow the development of complex gameplay without having to spend excessive time in creating a game's world.

1978's Maze Craze for the Atari VCS used an algorithm to generate a random, top-down maze for each game.

Some games used pseudorandom number generators. These PRNGs were often used with predefined seed values in order to generate very large game worlds that appeared to be premade. The Sentinel supposedly had 10,000 different levels stored in only 48 and 64 kilobytes. An extreme case was Elite, which was originally planned to contain a total of 248 (approximately 282 trillion) galaxies with 256 solar systems each. However, the publisher was afraid that such a gigantic universe would cause disbelief in players, and eight of these galaxies were chosen for the final version. Other notable early examples include the 1985 game Rescue on Fractalus that used fractals to procedurally create, in real time, the craggy mountains of an alien planet and River Raid, the 1982 Activision game that used a pseudorandom number sequence generated by a linear feedback shift register in order to generate a scrolling maze of obstacles.

Modern use

Though modern computer games do not have the same memory and hardware restrictions that earlier games had, the use of procedural generation is frequently employed to create randomized games, maps, levels, characters, or other facets that are unique on each playthrough.

In 2004, a PC first-person shooter called .kkrieger was released by a German demo group. It is entirely contained in a 96 kilobyte executable for Microsoft Windows that generates hundreds of megabytes of 3D and texture data when run. According to one of the programmers, "it was a complete failure as far as the game side was concerned (mostly because no one involved really deeply cared about that aspect)."

Naked Sky's RoboBlitz used procedural generation to maximize content in a less than 50 MB downloadable file for Xbox Live Arcade. Will Wright's Spore also makes use of procedural synthesis.

Procedural generation is often used in loot systems of quest-driven games, such as action role-playing games and massive multiplayer online role playing games. Though quests may feature fixed rewards, other loot, such as weapons and armor, may be generated for the player based on the player-character's level, the quest's level, their performance in the quest, and other random factors. This often leads to loot having a rarity quality applied to reflect when the procedural generation system has produced an item with better-than-average attributes. For example, the Borderlands series is based on its procedural generation system which can create over a million unique guns and other equipment.

Many open world or survival games procedurally create a game world from a random seed or one provided by the player, so that each playthrough is different. These generation systems create numerous pixel- or voxel-based biomes with distribution of resources, objects, and creatures. The player frequently has the ability to adjust some of the generation parameters, such as specifying the amount of water coverage in a world. Examples of such games include Dwarf Fortress and Minecraft.

Procedural generation is also used in space exploration and trading games. Elite: Dangerous, through using the 400 billion known stars of the Milky Way Galaxy as its world basis, uses procedural generation to simulate the planets in these solar systems. Similarly, Star Citizen uses the technology for its planets, to create a collection of seamlessly-loaded planet-sized planets among its hand-crafted universe. I-Novae Infinity features a plethora of planets which are procedurally generated between which the player can travel via space ships. Outerra Anteworld is a video game in development that uses procedural generation and real world data to create a virtual replica of planet Earth in true scale.

No Man's Sky, by using procedural generation, is the largest video game in history, featuring a universe of 18 quintillion full-sized planets across entire galaxies, and these galaxies can be explored in flight inch-by-inch, or on foot after a landing. The planets all have their own uniquely diverse terrain, weather, flora, and fauna, as well as a number of space-faring alien species. The same content exists at the same places for all players (thanks to a single random seed number to their deterministic engine), which enables players to meet and share discoveries.

Film
As in video games, procedural generation is often used in film to create visually interesting and accurate spaces rapidly. This comes in a wide variety of applications.

One application is known as an imperfect factory, where artists can rapidly generate many similar objects. This accounts for the fact that, in real life, no two objects are ever exactly alike. For instance, an artist could model a product for a grocery store shelf, and then create an imperfect factory to generate many similar objects to populate the shelf.

MASSIVE is a high-end computer animation and artificial intelligence software package used for generating crowd-related visual effects for film and television. It was developed to create fighting armies of hundreds of thousands of soldiers for Peter Jackson's The Lord of the Rings films automatically.

Coherent noise can be extremely important to procedural workflow in film. Simplex noise is often faster with fewer artifacts, though an older function called Perlin noise may be used as well. Coherent noise, in this case, refers to a function that generates smooth pseudo-randomness in  dimensions.

See also

 Cellular automata
 Computational creativity
 Dead Internet theory
 Fractal landscape
 Fractional Brownian motion
 Generative art
 L-systems
 Linear congruential generator
 List of games using procedural generation
 Media synthesis (AI)
 Noise, Perlin noise, Simplex noise
 Procedural animation
 Procedural modeling
 Procedural texture
 Random dungeon
 Random map
 Roguelike
 Scenery generator
 Wave function collapse

References

Further reading
 
 
 The Future Of Content – Will Wright keynote on Spore & procedural generation at the Game Developers Conference 2005

 
Applications of randomness